Takeda Izumo II (1691–1756) was a Japanese playwright. The successor to Chikimatsu Monzaemon at the Takemoto Theater, he wrote the three most celebrated period plays in the bunraku repertoire: Sugawara and the Secrets of Calligraphy (1746), Yoshitsune and the Thousand Cherry Trees (1747), and The Treasury of Loyal Retainers (1748). Leonard Pronko writes that although Chikamatsu’s writing “possesses superior literary qualities, Izumo’s has an undeniable variety, richness, and theatricality.”

References

1691 births
1756 deaths
Bunraku
Japanese writers of the Edo period
17th-century Japanese dramatists and playwrights
18th-century Japanese dramatists and playwrights